Sun Qiang (born 9 March 1970) is a former Chinese professional darts player who plays in the Professional Darts Corporation events.

Career
Sun qualified for the 2016 PDC World Darts Championship after winning the Greater China Qualifier. He played Mick McGowan in the preliminary round, but won only one leg and was beaten by two sets to nil. Sun returned a year later after again winning the Chinese Qualifier. He met Australian Corey Cadby in the preliminary round and lost 2–0, with Cadby producing a record prelim average of 102.48, over 30 points higher than Sun's.

World Championship results

PDC
 2016: Preliminary round: (lost to Mick McGowan 0–2)
 2017: Preliminary  round: (lost to Corey Cadby 0–2)

References

External links

1970 births
Living people
Chinese darts players
Professional Darts Corporation associate players